Tough Love Couples is the third season of the American reality television series Tough Love, which first aired on VH1. The show features six couples seeking relationship advice from the host and matchmaker, Steven Ward, and his mother JoAnn Ward, both of the Philadelphia-based Master Matchmakers.

Contestants

Episode Progress

 The couple had the best progress.
 The couple was commended for good progress.
 The couple had average progress.
 The couple had poor progress.
 The couple had the worst progress.
 The couple had the worst progress and was broken up by Steve.
 The couple had good progress and was in the hot seat.
 The couple left the show and broke up.

Episodes

Episode 1: "Couples Boot Camp Begins"
First aired April 12, 2010
 Challenge: Couples were asked to dress in wedding attire if ready to commit.
 Challenge Winner: Dennis and Simone.
 Weakest Couple: Mario and Christina.
 Episode Notes:

Episode 2: "Fighting Dirty"
First aired April 19, 2010
 Challenge: Communication
 Challenge Winner: No One
 Weakest Couple: Larry and Heather

Episode 3: "What Happens At Boot Camp..."
First aired April 26, 2010
 Challenge: Couples were sent to a sex shop to pick out adventurous new toys for each other.
 Challenge Winner: Mario and Christina showed the most progress.
 Weakest Couple: Dustin and Courtney were not only put on the hot seat, they were told to split up for the remainder of the show.
 Episode Notes: Dustin and Courtney will now be participating as single people and may be set up on dates.

Episode 4: "Temptation, Temptation"
First aired May 3, 2010
 Challenge:  Boundaries
 Challenge Winner: Ryan and Axelle
 Weakest Couple: Mario and Christina

Episode 5: "The Interrogation"
First aired May 10, 2010
 Challenge: Couples focused on communicating sensitive information to their partners.
 Challenge Winner: Mario and Christina
 Weakest Couple: Ryan and Axelle
 Episode Note: Ryan and Axelle broke up and they left the show.

Episode 6: "Exes is a Four Letter Word"
First aired May 17, 2010
 Challenge:  The couples are shaken when their ex-boyfriends and ex-girlfriends arrive at Boot Camp
 Challenge Winner: No One
 Weakest Couples: Dennis and Simone and Larry and Heather

Episode 7: "The Ring's The Thing"
First aired May 17, 2010
 Challenge: Couples are focused on getting serious about their possible engagements.
 Challenge Winner: Dennis and Simone
 Weakest Couple: Pawel and Danielle

Episode 8: "It's Now Or Never"
First aired May 24, 2010

References

External links
 Tough Love Official Site @ VH1.com
 Tough Love - Full Episodes @ VH1.com

2010 American television seasons
2010s American reality television series